Hoplogrammicosum cinnamomeum is a species of beetle in the family Cerambycidae, the only species in the genus Hoplogrammicosum.

References

Elaphidiini